I Gede Winasa (born 9 March 1950) is an Indonesian former politician who was the regent of Jembrana regency in Bali, from 2000 to 2010, when he was forced to step down because of term limits. He ran unsuccessfully for governor of Bali in 2008.

He was married to Banyuwangi regent Ratna Ani Lestari until 2013, when she divorced him. The Supreme Court of Indonesia sentenced him to seven years of prison in 2017 for a graft case.

Background
Winasa was born in Denpasar, Bali's capital, on 9 March 1950.

References

External links
About Winasa - Winasa Personal Website

1950 births
Living people
People from Denpasar
Balinese people
Indonesian Hindus
Indonesian Democratic Party of Struggle politicians
Regents of places in Indonesia
Mayors and regents of places in Bali
Indonesian politicians convicted of corruption